A Future to This Life: Robocop – The Series Soundtrack is a 1995 television soundtrack album by Joe Walsh with various artists, which was released on January 24, 1995, on both CD and cassette by Pyramid. It was the soundtrack for Stephen Downing' short-lived series RoboCop: The Series, based on the RoboCop film series. The series stars Richard Eden as the title character. Made to appeal primarily to children and young teenagers, it lacks the graphic violence that was the hallmark of RoboCop (1987) and its sequel RoboCop 2 (1990).

Aside from the show's theme writers, Joe Walsh and Lita Ford, it features classic rock songs from The Band, The Flamingos, Iron Butterfly, and KC & the Sunshine Band. It also marked the final contribution for pianist and organist Nicky Hopkins, who died the year before its release.

Track listing

Personnel
Credits are adapted from the album's liner notes.

 Joe Walsh – lead vocals, guitar, percussion, sound effects, backing vocals
 Lita Ford – lead vocals, guitar, backing vocals
 Levon Helm – lead vocals, drums
 Dave Edmunds – lead vocals
 E.J. Waters – lead vocals
 Frankie Miller – lead vocals
 Andy Goldman – guitar, backing vocals
 Jim Weider – guitar, backing vocals
 Joe Vitale – keyboards, drums, percussion
 Garth Hudson – keyboards
 Nicky Hopkins – keyboards
 Randy Ciarlante – drums, backing vocals
 Jack Ciano – drums
 Ian Wallace – drums
 Bobby Strickland – tenor saxophone, baritone saxophone
 Dave Douglas – trumpet
 Richard Bell – organ
 Vassar Clements – fiddle
 Kevin Sepe – backing vocals
 Rick Danko – backing vocals

References

External links

Joe Walsh albums
1995 soundtrack albums
Albums produced by Todd Rundgren
Television soundtracks
Albums produced by Bill Szymczyk
Hard rock soundtracks
Soundtracks published posthumously